Delirium Café is a bar in Brussels, Belgium, known for its long beer list, standing at 2,004 brands in January 2004 as recorded in the Guinness Book of Records. On offer are beers from over 60 countries, including many Belgian beers.

The bar is located in the small alley called Impasse de la Fidélité/Getrouwheidsgang, only a couple of hundred metres from the Grand-Place. The Jeanneke Pis statue is across the street from the entrance.

The bar's name comes from the beer Delirium Tremens, whose pink elephant symbol also decorates the café's entrance.

Delirium Café has been expanding internationally, opening franchises in Rio de Janeiro (2010), in Tokyo (2011), São Paulo and Warsaw (2014),  Lisbon (2017), Toulouse and Reims (dates unknown), Leesburg, Virginia, US (2017), Strasbourg (2017), and Kuala Lumpur (2018).

References

External links
 Delirium Café's official homepage

 Delirium international site

Drinking establishments in Europe
Food and drink companies of Belgium
Food and drink companies based in Brussels